Wang Quan is the name of:

Wang Quan (footballer) (born 1989), Chinese association footballer
Wang Quan (handballer) (born 1992), Chinese handballer